The International Iranian Economic Association (IIEA) is a private, non-profit, and non-political organization of scholars interested in the study of economic issues concerning Iran, in the broadest sense of the term.

The objectives of the IIEA are:

 Promotion of high standard economic scholarship and research on Iran's economy
 Promotion of cooperation among persons and organizations committed to the objectives of IIEA
 Facilitation of communication among scholars through its webpage, meetings and publications
 Promotion of better understanding of Iran's economic policy challenges and opportunities.

Board of Directors
The Board of Directors of the International Iranian Economic Association (IIEA) consists of:

Executive Officers

Elected Board Members

Co-opted Board Members

Previous Board Members

Past Presidents

Past Executive Secretaries

Past Treasurers

Founding members
Founding members of the IIEA are:

Conferences 
IIEA has held a series of conferences on the Iranian Economy:
 Conference on Iran's Economy (2008), The University of Illinois at Urbana-Champaign, Illinois, USA, December 11–13, 2008
 Iranian Economy at a Crossroads: Domestic and Global Challenges (2009), University of Southern California, Los Angeles, California, USA, September 18–19, 2009
 Conference on the Iranian Economy (2010), University of Chicago, Illinois, USA, October 15–17, 2010
 First Inaugural Conference on the Iranian Economy (2011), SOAS, University of London, London, UK, December 7–8, 2011
 Second International Conference on the Iranian Economy (2013), Istanbul Bilgi University, Istanbul, Turkey, June 24–25, 2013
 Third International Conference on the Iranian Economy (2014), Boston College, Boston, Massachusetts, USA, 24–25 October 2014
 Fourth International Conference on the Iranian Economy (2016), Center for Near and Middle Eastern Studies, University of Marburg, Marburg (Germany), 17–18 June 2016 
 Fifth International Conference on the Iranian Economy (2018), International Institute of Social History, Amsterdam, The Netherlands, March 8–9, 2018
 Sixth International Conference on the Iranian Economy (2019), Department of Asian, African and Mediterranean Studies, Università degli Studi di Napoli "L'Orientale", Naples, Italy, May 16–17, 2019
 Seventh International Conference on Iran’s Economy (2020), Middle Eastern Studies Department, College of Humanities and Social Sciences, Hamad Bin Khalifa University, December 15–17, 2020

See also

Economy of Iran

References 

Academic organisations based in the United Kingdom
International economic organizations
Economy of Iran